Schist Peak is a peak, 1,650 m, surmounting the divide between the Willis and Packard Glaciers in the Saint Johns Range of Victoria Land. Named by the Victoria University of Wellington Antarctic Expedition (VUWAE) (1959–60) for the rock type of which it is composed.

Mountains of Victoria Land
Scott Coast